Mark Harold Pike (December 27, 1963 – December 8, 2021) was an American professional football player who was a linebacker, defensive end, and special teamer for twelve seasons in the National Football League (NFL) with the Buffalo Bills. He played in four Super Bowls.

Biography
Pike was a graduate of Dixie Heights High School in Erlanger, Kentucky.

He died on December 8, 2021, at age 57, from non-Hodgkin lymphoma complicated by COVID-19 pneumonia.

References
 

1963 births
2021 deaths
American football defensive linemen
Buffalo Bills players
Georgia Tech Yellow Jackets football players
Players of American football from Kentucky
People from Elizabethtown, Kentucky
Deaths from non-Hodgkin lymphoma
Deaths from the COVID-19 pandemic in Kentucky
Deaths from cancer in New York (state)